The 1982–83 New Jersey Devils season was the franchise's ninth season in the NHL and the first in New Jersey after moving from Colorado, where they were known as the Colorado Rockies. The Devils first ever game was a 3-3 tie with the Pittsburgh Penguins, where first captain Don Lever scored the Devils' first ever goal. The team's first win would come against their new rivals, the New York Rangers. However, the new location didn't help the team overall, as they continued to struggle in the standings, finishing last in their division and third-to-last in their conference.

Regular season

Season standings

Schedule and results

October 
Record: 3-6-3, Home: 2-3-2, Away: 1-3-1

November 
Record: 1-10-4, Home: 0-3-2, Away: 1-7-2

December 
Record: 3-9-0, Home: 2-4-0, Away: 1-5-0

January 
Record: 4-6-4, Home: 4-1-3, Away: 0-5-1

February 
Record: 1-8-2, Home: 1-2-2, Away: 0-6-0

March 
Record: 4-10-0, Home: 2-7-0, Away: 2-3-0

April 
Record: 1-0-1, Home: 0-0-0, Away: 1-0-1

Player statistics

Skaters
Note: GP = Games played; G = Goals; A = Assists; Pts = Points; PIM = Penalty minutes

†Denotes player spent time with another team before joining New Jersey.  Stats reflect time with the Devils only.
‡Traded mid-season

Note: GP = Games played; TOI = Time on ice (minutes); W = Wins; L = Losses; OT = Overtime/shootout losses; GA = Goals against; SO = Shutouts; GAA = Goals against average

†Denotes player spent time with another team before joining New Jersey.  Stats reflect time with the Devils only.
‡Traded mid-season
Bold/italics denotes franchise record

Transactions
The Devils were involved in the following transactions during the 1982–83 season.

Trades

Free agents

Draft picks
The Devils' draft picks at the 1982 NHL Entry Draft at the Montreal Forum in Montreal, Quebec, Canada.

See also
 1982–83 NHL season

Notes

References

New Jersey Devils seasons
New Jersey Devils
New Jersey Devils
New Jersey Devils
New Jersey Devils
20th century in East Rutherford, New Jersey
Meadowlands Sports Complex